Jack Downs (born 10 November 1995) is an English professional rugby league footballer who last played as a  forward for the Batley Bulldogs in the Betfred Championship. 

He has previously played for Hull F.C. in the Super League, and spent time on loan from Hull at Doncaster in League 1.

Background
Jack was born in Kingston upon Hull, East Riding of Yorkshire, England.

Downs played for local club Cottingham Tigers A.R.L.F.C., when he was younger, before joining Hull FC.

Career
Downs made his début for hometown club Hull F.C. on 14 August 2015 in a Super League match against St. Helens at Langtree Park.

Batley Bulldogs
On 14 November 2019 it was announced that he had left the club with immediate effect

References

External links
Hull FC profile
SL profile

1995 births
Living people
Batley Bulldogs players
Doncaster R.L.F.C. players
English rugby league players
Hull F.C. players
Rugby league centres
Rugby league players from Kingston upon Hull
Rugby league second-rows